The following is a list of Miss World titleholders from the competition's inaugural edition in 1951 to present.

Miss World titleholders
† = deceased

Notes:
 Marjorie Wallace, the 1973 winner, became the first titleholder not to complete her reign, when in March 1974, she was fired for "failing to fulfill the basic requirements of the job". Organisers extended an offer to first runner-up Evangeline Pascual of the Philippines to complete the duties of Miss World for the remainder of the year, but without holding the title; when Pascual turned down that offer, organisers next turned to second runner-up Patsy Yuen of Jamaica, who accepted.
 The 2002 pageant was originally to be held in Abuja, Nigeria, but was relocated to the United Kingdom after anti-pageant rioting.
 The 2008 pageant was originally to be held in Kyiv, Ukraine, but was relocated to South Africa after a diplomatic crisis between Russia and Georgia.
 Three countries have achieved back-to-back wins: Sweden in 1951 and 1952, United Kingdom in 1964 and 1965, and India in 1999 and 2000.

Countries by number of wins

Continents by number of wins

Assumed wins 
Titles assumed following resignations.

Resigned wins

Winners gallery

See also
 List of Miss World runners-up and finalists
 List of Miss Earth titleholders
 List of Miss International titleholders
 List of Miss Universe titleholders
 Big Four international beauty pageants

References

External links
 

Miss World
Miss World titleholders
Miss World titleholders